Bernard Franken (5 February 1914 – 4 April 2001) was a Dutch racing cyclist. He rode in the 1948 Tour de France.

References

External links

1914 births
2001 deaths
Dutch male cyclists
Cyclists from Antwerp
20th-century Dutch people